Grove Isle is a  island lying off the north-east coast of Miami's Coconut Grove neighborhood.  Three waterfront hi-rise residences have been built on the island which were master-planned to include a resort hotel, restaurants, marina, club amenities and services.

Origins 

First known as Fair Isle, its land was dredged out from Biscayne Bay in 1924 by the Corps of Engineers and subsequently subdivided in 1925.  Many artificial islands of the period, such as Fair Isle, were formed when artificial inlets were cut into Biscayne Bay's coastline.  The isle was then sold to investors at the height of the Florida Land Boom in less than four hours and for over $1.5 million. A combination of real estate crash, freight blockades and hurricane damage during 1925–26 stalled further property development of Miami and the island.

Development

The island remained largely untouched—a large sand bar covered with Australian Pines—until large scale development came to Coconut Grove in the late 1970s and early 1980s. The island was purchased for $6 million and restrictions on the island's development were finally agreed after protracted litigation over its size was settled in July 1977.  Cabot, Cabot and Forbes of Massachusetts were one of the principal sellers of the island.  Martin Margulies and Sun Bank of Miami were its eventual buyers and subsequently invested $100 million to develop the property.

Burton Goldberg, the notorious Miami nightclub impresario, had previously hoped to make the island's "sailboat key" club and residential project the largest in South Florida.  His development ended in foreclosure having been stalled by legal battles with stakeholders and residents.  The design was significantly reworked and Margulies' scaled-back development was finally completed in 1982. Off-island Club membership was also agreed so its amenities would be enjoyed by the wider community. The project finally consisted of three residential towers, a hotel and club, deep-water marina, pools, professional tennis club, original 55 piece sculpture gardens.  The Grove Isle development set the standard for high-end Miami property.

Grove Isle lies in parts three feet above sea level.  Its drainage system was surveyed as part of the condominium's 40 year re-certification project.

Character

Grove Isle provides one of the most secluded spots to live in Miami and is highly prized "by residents for its tranquillity and panoramic bay views". Its residents have included past Heads of State, Senators, judges, lawyers, doctors, corporate leaders, entrepreneurs and philanthropists. Grove Isle has been described as one of the most affluent neighborhoods in the United States.

The Palmeiras Beach Club and Hotel, Spa, Grove Isle Marina and Cliff Drysdale Grove Isle Tennis Club were located on the island.  The world-class Grove Isle Sculpture Garden once comprised part of the island's landscaped design. The three residential towers' interior designs were unique in the area for their Asian themes and accents. The island club restaurant, operating under the name of Baleen and then Gibraltar, were well regarded in their time.

The island's wide open spaces and expansive tree canopy are valued highly by its residents.  The gardens and decks of Grove Isle were  replanted after damage received from Hurricane Irma in September 2017.  Major renovations to improve the structural and aesthetic integrity of the three towers, their decks and the gardens were also undertaken. The retention of the island's tree canopy and its mature trees remain a priority for many on Grove Isle and in Coconut Grove.

A further residential development on the site of the Island's hotel and club was first proposed in 2013.

Controversy 

Competing visions for Grove Isle’s future have at times embroiled the island in controversy.  Its 1980 development was only permitted under a landmark settlement after the project was significantly scaled back over a decade of litigation and protest.  A further proposal to develop the island’s yacht club also ended up in court due to concerns about its environmental impact. The residents association also worked to protect the island against the impact of a high-rise project on an adjacent Mercy Hospital site.

More recently, attempts to close the island’s club were halted by court order in August 2015.   This was linked to efforts, first started in 2013, to build a further residential development on the island.  Residents' efforts to retain the island's hotel, which was put at risk by the new development plans, resulted in litigation in 2017.  The Grove Isle club and hotel were demolished in 2020. The development project then underwent a change in ownership and was rebranded the following year.

Issues regarding club membership rights, the quality of club amenities, city planning laws, bridge safety and further development plans for the island (at 4 Grove Isle) have involved lengthy legal intervention.

Gallery

See also

 Barrier island
 List of islands
Coconut Grove

References

Bibliography and further reading
Final Settlement of 27 July 1977, Circuit Court of the 11th Judicial Circuit in and for Dade County, Florida, Case No.  73-6449 copy accessed January 11, 2016
Margulies, M., Harper, P., & Varon, M. (1986). Contemporary sculpture from the Martin Z. Margulies collection: Grove Isle, Coconut Grove, Florida. Coconut Grove, Fla: Martin Z. Margulies Collection. 144 pp. [UM and FIU Libraries Special Collections]
Moore Parks, A. and Bennett, B. (2010) Coconut Grove, Florida: Arcadia Publishing, p. 128
Nepomechie, M., & Brooke, S. (2010). Building paradise: An architectural guide to the Magic City. Miami, FL: AIA Miami.
Voss G. (1974) Biological survey and development recommendations for Fair Isle, Biscayne Bay, Fla. Unpublished manuscript. University of Miami, Rosenstiel School of Marine and Atmospheric Science, Miami, FL. 15 pp.

External links

 Grove Isle HOA web site
 Palmeiras Beach Club at Grove Isle
 Cliff Drysdale Club at Grove Isle
 Preserve Grove Isle web site
 Biscayne Bay Aquatic Preserve management Plan
Save Grove Isle Complaint : Circuit Court of the 11th Judicial Circuit in and for Miami Dade County,  Filing 98205191 Oct 2019

1920s establishments in Florida
Artificial islands of Florida
Atlantic Coast barrier islands of Florida
Coconut Grove (Miami)
Gated communities in Florida
Islands of Florida
Islands of Miami-Dade County, Florida
Islands of Miami
Planned communities in Florida
Populated coastal places in Florida on the Atlantic Ocean
Residential condominiums in the United States